Tanya Ragir is an American contemporary sculptor, born in Los Angeles in 1955. She is best known for her sculptures centered on the nude feminine figure, sensually juxtaposing the feminine landscape with geometric forms. She sculpts in clay, the pieces being later fired or cast in bronze, aluminum, stainless steel and resin.

Career
Ragir received a Bachelor's Degree in Sculpture and Dance from the University of California, Santa Cruz in 1976. After creating fully three-dimensional pieces for many years, her recent work is rich in shallow wall sculptures. Ragir´s works have been featured in several motion pictures; most notably in Meet the Fockers (2004)  and in Mannequin (1987). She is an elected member of the National Sculpture Society
and also a member of the International Sculpture Center, and the Southern California Women´s Caucus for Art. Among many honors, Ragir received a Certificate of Excellence in Sculpture in the California Art Club 101ST Annual Gold Medal Awards (2014).

Exhibitions

Permanent
Some of Tanya Ragir´s sculptures are permanently exhibited in public places including:
 Avalon´s Legacy, Moment In Time (Boys), Moment In Time (Girls) and Legacy (bronze sculptures): in Brea, California
 Harmony (bronze, copper and steel) at Oakbrook Center in Chicago
 Air (bronze): in Rose Art Museum at Brandeis University, Waltham, Massachusetts
 Totem (resin): at Cerro Coso Community College in Ridgecrest, California 
 Mother and Child and Legacy (bronze sculptures): at Jewish Home for the Aging in Reseda, California

Recent past exhibitions
Ragir´s work has been extensively exhibited for over 25 years very many galleries and museums across the US and abroad. Among recent shows one may mention:

2016 (Feb-Mar 3) Sculpture MAZE, bG Gallery Bergamot Station
2016 (Jan 29-31) Fabrikexpo, Los Angeles, CA 
2015 - 2016 (Dec 11-Jan 8), California Regional Showcase at Manifest Gallery
2015 (Sep 3-30) Tanya Ragir:The Warrior Series, Gloria Delson Contemporary Arts, Los Angeles
2014 (whole year) Grand Rapids Art Museum
2013 (Jun 2-23) California Art Club, 102nd Annual Gold Medal Juried Exhibition
2012 (Sep 13-30) Gallery É, Tanya-Ragir-and-Sasha-vom-Dorp Exhibition, Los Angeles

External links
Tanya Ragir official website

References

1955 births
Living people
20th-century American women artists
American women sculptors
Artists from Los Angeles
University of California, Santa Cruz alumni
Sculptors from California
21st-century American women artists